Toby George Edser (born 28 February 1999) is an English professional footballer who plays as a midfielder for  club Ebbsfleet United. He began his senior career at Nottingham Forest and spent time on loan at Woking and Port Vale. He never played a first-team game with Nottingham Forest and joined Aldershot Town after being released in June 2020. He joined Ebbsfleet United after two seasons with Aldershot.

Early and personal life
Edser is from Burpham and attended George Abbot School.

Career

Nottingham Forest
Edser was spotted by Fulham playing for the Guildford Saints as an eight-year old, and was signed to the club's Academy until his release at age 15. He was then an associated schoolboy at Charlton Athletic, before he signed a two-year scholarship at Nottingham Forest in 2015. He helped Forest's under-18 team to win their league and reach the fifth round of the FA Youth Cup during the 2015–16 season. He went on to captain the under-23 side the following season and was an unused substitute for the first-team in the Championship, first appearing on the bench at the City Ground in October 2016; it was reported that he was expected to have made his senior debut had Mark Warburton's side not taken until the final day of the season to secure safety from relegation. He went on to sign a new three-year contract, but found breaking into the first-team more difficult during the 2017–18 season due to an influx of midfielders signed in the summer.

On 19 October 2018, he joined National League South side Woking on a one-month loan deal. He made his debut for the "Cardinals" at the Kingfield Stadium the next day, helping his new team to beat Welling United 1–0 in the  fourth qualification round of the FA Cup. After his loan was extended he scored his first goal for the club on 24 November, in a 2–0 victory over Folkestone Invicta in the third qualification round of the FA Trophy to secure the "Cards" a place in the first round proper of the competition. Woking went on to cause a cup upset in the second round proper of the FA Cup, knocking out League Two side Swindon Town at the County Ground. He scored a total of four goals in 19 appearances for Alan Dowson's Woking. On 31 January 2019, he joined League Two club Port Vale on loan until the end of the 2018–19 season.

He returned on loan to Woking in August 2019, who were now playing in the National League. He later said he regretted leaving Woking after his first spell. He was released by Nottingham Forest at the end of the 2019–20 season.

Aldershot Town
On 18 September 2020, Edser signed with National League side Aldershot Town and said that "I'm really happy, it's been a bit stressful over the last few months". He scored four goals in 43 league appearances in the 2020–21 season and was re-signed for another year. However he missed two months of the 2021–22 campaign with injury, marking his return to fitness in January with a goal in a 1–1 draw with Maidenhead United at the Recreation Ground.

Ebbsfleet United
In July 2022, he signed for National League South side Ebbsfleet United following a trial.

Style of play
Edser has been described by the Port Vale club website as "a talented playmaker with a strong technical ability". The Nottingham Forest club website stated that "his intelligence on the ball allows him to dictate play wherever he is on the field". He has described himself as "quite a leader on the pitch".

Career statistics

References

1999 births
Living people
Sportspeople from Guildford
English footballers
Fulham F.C. players
Charlton Athletic F.C. players
Nottingham Forest F.C. players
Woking F.C. players
Port Vale F.C. players
Aldershot Town F.C. players
Ebbsfleet United F.C. players
National League (English football) players
Association football midfielders